Anders Birger "Lövet" Lööf (born 11 May 1961) is a Swedish curler.

In 2002 he was inducted into the Swedish Curling Hall of Fame.

Teams

Personal life
His sister is Annika Lööf, .

References

External links
 

Living people
1961 births
Swedish male curlers
Place of birth missing (living people)
20th-century Swedish people